Proto-oncogene FRAT1 is a protein that in humans is encoded by the FRAT1 gene.

The protein encoded by this gene belongs to the GSK-3-binding protein family. It may function in tumor progression and in lymphomagenesis.

References

Further reading

External links